Sarab-e Ganj Ali (also Romanized as Sarāb-e Ganj ʿAlī) is a village in Jayedar Rural District, in the Central District of Pol-e Dokhtar County, Lorestan Province, Iran. At the 2006 census, its population was 306, in 66 families.

References 

Towns and villages in Pol-e Dokhtar County